Mattia Bodano (born 11 August 1990) is an Italian midfielder, currently on the books of Progetto Calcio Sant'Elia, co-ownership with Cagliari.

Caps on Italian Series 

Lega Pro Seconda Divisione : 3 caps

Total : 3 caps

External links

Living people
1990 births
Italian footballers
Association football wingers
U.S. Gavorrano players